HMY Osborne is the name of two British Royal Yachts:
 , renamed  in 1855
 

Royal Navy ship names